Seth Accra Jaja is a Professor of Management Science and a distinguished Nigerian academic. He was appointed as the 2nd vice-chancellor of the Federal University, Otuoke, Bayelsa State, Nigeria by the Federal Government of Nigeria in 2016 succeeding Bolaji Aluko.

References 

Nigerian academics
Living people
Year of birth missing (living people)
Vice-Chancellors of Nigerian universities